Jackson Hlungwani (born 1923 - 20 January 2010) was a South African sculptor, priest, and founder of the Yesu Galeliya One Aposto in Sanyoni Alt and Omega in New Jerusalem, a site located in Mbhokota in the Limpopo. A deeply religious man, Hlunwani's work is defined by its spirituality and connection to the community.

Early life

Childhood 

Jackson Hlunwani was born in the year 1923, birth date unknown, to a Tsonga family in a Mashamba Village located in the now-dissolved Venda, South Africa. Hlungwani was named after his grandfather’s name, Bhandi Pavalala, which is believed to be a sacred Tsonga/Shangaan name of the gods. Hlungwani’s grandfather died a week before he was born, and the grandfather was believed to have been reborn in his grandson. His family was later forced to relocate to Gazankulu following the Apartheid Act of 1948. Hlunwangi learned the Tsonga techniques of wood-carving and carpentry through his father, a skill which he would go on to use his entire artistic career.

Adulthood 

Hlungwani worked in Johannesburg from 1941-1944, returning to his homeland following an incident at work that led to the loss of a finger. Upon his return, Hlungwani started a journey to find inner healing, which led him to become an involved member and later a priest of the Zion Christian Church from 1944 to 1978.

Themes 
The importance of religion is inseparable from the conversation when analyzing Hlungwani's works. In the contemporary exhibition space, Hlungwani’s religious claims were often dismissed as “quaint curiosity” and not as a major impacting factor of the work itself. However, Hlungwani felt it his divine calling to use sculpture to communicate God's messages to the people of a war-torn and racially divided country. 
In Hlungwani's first conversation with Marcelle Manley, a journalist, Manley recalls the how, “(Hlungwani) was sitting on a balcony-like platform above the assembled works of his hands, chopping indefatigably with a homemade adze at yet another log. An electric heater burned beside him, toasting his ulcered leg where, many years before, the arrow of Satan had entered and lodged in his flesh, then turned into a snake. The fire kept the wound from heating so that the Evil One could, at the appointed time, exit by the same mute. He told me this within minutes of meeting me, without inhibition or any doubt about the significance of his experience.” 
This is an example of how Hlungwani drew on multiple cultures for sources of inspiration and how he aimed to evoke spiritual worlds through symbolism with his sculptures.

References

1923 births
2010 deaths
South African sculptors